Eldorado High School may refer to:

 Eldorado High School (New Mexico), United States
 Eldorado High School (Nevada), United States
 Eldorado High School (Illinois), United States
 Eldorado High School (Oklahoma), United States
 Eldorado High School (Texas), United States
 Eldorado High School (Namibia), Africa